Kim Cheol-ho or Kim Chŏl-ho (김철호) may refer to:
Kim Chul-ho (boxer) (born 1961), South Korean boxer
Kim Cheol-ho (footballer) (born 1983), South Korean footballer
Kim Chol-ho (born 1985), North Korean footballer
Kim Chol-ho (footballer, born 1995), South Korean footballer